The 2019 Campeones Cup was the second edition of the Campeones Cup, an annual North American football match contested between the champions of the previous Major League Soccer season and the winner of the Campeón de Campeones from Liga MX.

The match featured Atlanta United FC, winners of the 2018 MLS Cup, and América, winners of the 2019 Campeón de Campeones. Atlanta United hosted the match at Mercedes-Benz Stadium in Atlanta, Georgia, United States, on August 14, 2019.

Venue

Atlanta United FC hosted the match at their home stadium, Mercedes-Benz Stadium in Atlanta. The announced attendance was 40,128 (a Campeones Cup Record). Although the stadium can hold 71,000, the upper deck was curtained off, limiting the capacity to 42,000.

Match

Details

Statistics

References

External links

2019
2019 in American soccer
2019–20 in Mexican football
Atlanta United FC matches
Club América matches
2019 in sports in Georgia (U.S. state)
August 2019 sports events in the United States